Derrick Grant (born 19 April 1938) is a former  international rugby union player.

He scored one try for Scotland. He was selected for the 1966 British Lions tour to Australia and New Zealand but did not play in any of the internationals.

He played club rugby for Hawick RFC.

He was Hawick's most successful ever coach in the 1970s and 1980s coaching Hawick to 5 division 1 championships in a row. He also coached the Scotland team during the 80's.

His brother was another Scotland cap, Oliver Grant.

References

1938 births
Living people
British & Irish Lions rugby union players from Scotland
Hawick RFC players
Hawick Trades players
Rugby union flankers
Rugby union players from Hawick
Scotland international rugby union players
Scotland national rugby union team coaches
Scottish rugby union coaches
Scottish rugby union players